Lassik may refer to:
 Lassik people, one of the Eel River Athapaskan peoples of California
 Lassik language, the language formerly spoken by them

See also 
 Lassic, 19th-century leader of the Eel River Athapaskan peoples
 Lasic (disambiguation)
 Lasik

Language and nationality disambiguation pages